The 50th Armored Division was a division of the Army National Guard from July 1946 until 1993.

History

On 13 October 1945 the War Department published a postwar policy statement for the entire Army, calling for a 27-division Army National Guard structure with 25 infantry divisions and two armored divisions. Once the process of negotiation was complete, among the new formations formed were the 49th and 50th Armored Divisions, the first armored divisions in the Army National Guard. The 50th Armored Division replaced the 44th Infantry Division within the New Jersey Army National Guard, with the 50th Armored assuming the 44th Infantry's "Jersey Blues" nickname. Most 50th Armored Division units were legacy units of the 44th Infantry and inherited the lineage and history of those units.

In a 1968 reorganization, the 50th Armored was joined by the 27th Armored Brigade from New York, the legacy units left after the inactivation of the 27th Armored Division. Since the 50th Armored Division was no longer completely within New Jersey, it retired the "Jersey Blues" nickname. In 1968, the 50th Armored Division was reorganized to draw its units from New Jersey and the Vermont Army National Guard. Armor battalions in New Jersey and Vermont were upgraded to M48A1 and M48A3 Patton medium tanks.

Between 1975-76 Vermont and New Jersey armor battalions started turning in their M48A3 tanks and began receiving the M48A5 which had the same 105mm gun and fire control system as the M60A1 in use by the active Army. During this time, many Vermont tank crews competed in gunnery exercises held in West Germany and consistently brought back awards. The division's training was rigorous during the Soviet threat peak years of the late 1970s to mid 1980s. Germany was the primary area of operations for the division if it was to have been activated.

The bi-state organization comprised:
Headquarters, 50th Armored Division (Somerset, New Jersey)
104th Engineer Battalion HQ & HQ, Co.A, Co.B, Co.C, Co.E (bridge) Teaneck, New Jersey. Co.D, Vermont
5th Squadron, 117th Cavalry
150th Aviation Battalion (UH-1 & AH-1 Hueys) (later 1st Battalion, 150th Aviation)
1st Brigade (Woodbridge, New Jersey)
2nd Brigade (Cherry Hill, New Jersey)
86th Brigade (Montpelier, Vermont)
Division Artillery (Trenton, New Jersey)
Division Support Command

The Center of Military History notes that reorganizing the Army National Guard to meet the new 'Division 86' structures in the mid-1980s was a challenging process, and most Guard divisions expanded their recruiting areas. The 50th Armored Division did not, and instead had the allotment for one of its brigades moved to the Texas Army National Guard, making the future of the division within the force structure 'uncertain'. During this time, both battalions of Vermont's 172nd Armor 86th Brigade began doing their annual training at Fort Hood, Texas, a change from their former armor deployment base of Fort Drum, New York. By October 1986, Vermont's 86th Brigade left the 50th Armor Division and became part of the 26th Infantry Division. A few years later the 86th went to the 42nd ID and received M60A3 medium tanks.

Inactivation 
On 1 September 1993, the 50th Armored Division was inactivated and its remaining brigades joined other divisions. New Jersey's 50th Infantry Brigade, which took the Division's lineage, was made part of the 42nd Infantry Division. The 36th Infantry Brigade from Texas was reabsorbed into the 49th Armored Division. In the early 1990s further consolidation followed the fall of the Soviet Union, and the 26th Infantry Division inactivated, causing Vermont's 86th Brigade to join the 42nd Infantry Division and soon receive M1A2 Abrams main battle tanks. While under the 50th Armor Division, Vermont's 1st and 2d Battalion, 172nd Armor of the 86th Brigade excelled at tank gunnery and field exercises, making the 86th Brigade the only Army National Guard unit to ever consistently accomplish Tank Table XIII, an honor it continued to earn even after the 50th AD inactivated. Due to further military consolidations, the 86th Brigade turned in its Abrams tanks in 2006 and ended its Armor designation just short of 40 years.

Organization 1989 

At the end of the Cold War the division was a unit of the New Jersey Army National Guard, with a round-out brigade from the Texas Army National Guard. The division was organized according to the Army of Excellence table of organization and equipment:

 50th Armored Division, Somerset, New Jersey
 Headquarters & Headquarters Company
 1st Brigade, Woodbridge
 Headquarters & Headquarters Company
 1st Battalion, 102nd Armor, Phillipsburg
 2nd Battalion, 113th Infantry, Newark
 3rd Battalion, 113th Infantry, Riverdale
 2nd Brigade, Cherry Hill
 Headquarters & Headquarters Company
 2nd Battalion, 102nd Armor, West Orange
 3rd Battalion, 102nd Armor Vineland
 1st Battalion, 114th Infantry, Woodbury
 2nd Battalion, 114th Infantry Long Branch
 36th Brigade, Houston, Texas (Texas Army National Guard)
 Headquarters & Headquarters Company
 7th Battalion, 112th Armor, Bryan, Texas
 8th Battalion, 112th Armor, Dallas, Texas
 Aviation Brigade, 50th Armored Division, West Trenton
 Headquarters & Headquarters Company
 5th Squadron, 117th Cavalry (Reconnaissance), Westfield Army Airfield
 1st Battalion, 150th Aviation (Attack), West Trenton
 Company D, 150th Aviation (Command Support), Burlington Army Airfield (Vermont Army National Guard)
 Company E, 150th Aviation (Assault), New Castle Army Airfield (Delaware Army National Guard)
 50th Armored Division Artillery, Trenton
 Headquarters & Headquarters Battery
 1st Battalion, 112th Field Artillery, Cherry Hill (18 × M109A3 155mm self-propelled howitzers)
 3rd Battalion, 112th Field Artillery, Morristown (18 × M109A3 155mm self-propelled howitzers)
 4th Battalion, 112th Field Artillery, Lawrenceville (12 × M110A2 203mm self-propelled howitzers)
 1st Battalion, 133rd Field Artillery, Beaumont (Texas Army National Guard) (18 × M109A3 155mm self-propelled howitzers)
 Battery A, 197th Field Artillery (Target Acquisition), (New Hampshire Army National Guard)
 50th Armored Division Support Command, East Orange
 Headquarters & Headquarters Company
 50th Support Battalion (Forward), Teaneck
 150th Support Battalion (Forward), Jersey City
 250th Support Battalion (Main), Sea Girt
 536th Support Battalion (Forward), (Texas Army National Guard)
 Company F, 150th Aviation (Aviation Intermediate Maintenance), Dover
 3rd Battalion, 200th Air Defense Artillery, (New Mexico Army National Guard) (MIM-72 Chaparral, M163 Vulcan & FIM-92 Stinger)
 104th Engineer Battalion, Teaneck
 250th Signal Battalion, Plainfield
 550th Military Intelligence Battalion, Pedricktown
 50th Military Police Company, Somerset
 50th Chemical Company, Sea Girt
 50th Armored Division Band, Jersey City

The brigade's armor battalions were equipped with M60A3 TTS main battle tanks. M48A5 Patton tanks had been replaced by M60A3 TTS tanks by May 1987 and by the end of 1989 the National Guard fielded 3,072 M60A3 TTS. The 410 M1 Abrams tanks of the National Guard were issued to round-out units of army divisions. The division's infantry battalions were equipped with M113 armored personnel carriers, of which the National Guard had 6,870 at the end of Fiscal Year 1987, with a further 1,411 due to be taken in service in 1988. The standard helicopters of National Guard units were the AH-1S Cobra, of which the National Guard had approximately 350 by 1989, the OH-58C Kiowa and the UH-1H Iroquois helicopters. Cavalry Reconnaissance units fielded 19 × M60A3 TTS, 8 × AH-1S Cobra, 12 × OH-58C Kiowa and 1 × UH-1H Iroquois helicopters; attack battalions fielded 21 × AH-1S Cobra, 13 × OH-58C Kiowa and 3 × UH-1H Iroquois helicopters, while the assault aviation company fielded 15 × UH-1H Iroquois helicopters and the command support aviation company UH-1 helicopters in various configurations.

Commanders of the 50th Armored Division
{| border="0" cellspacing="0" cellpadding="20" align="center"
|-
|valign="top" width="33%"|
Major General Clifford R. Powell, July 1946 - November 1948
Major General Donald W. McGowan, November 1948 - October 1955
Major General Edward O. Wolf, October 1955 - December 1965
Major General James H. Weyhenmeyer Jr., December 1965 - March 1977
Major General Herman S. Tenkin, April 1977 - October 1979
Major General George J. Betor, October 1979 - September 1981
Major General Melvin J. Crain, September 1981 - March 1986
Major General Mark B. Mullin, March 1986 - April 1990
Major General Richard S. Schneider, April 1990 - October 1991
Major General Robert J. Byrne, October 1991 - September 1993

References
Notes

Bibliography

http://www.geocities.com/armored50th/50th_Armored.html (Archived 2009-10-23)

500th Armored Division, U.S.
Divisions of the United States Army National Guard
Military units and formations established in 1946
Military units and formations disestablished in 1993